Emmanuelle 2 (aka Emmanuelle, The Joys of a Woman, original title Emmanuelle: L'antivierge) is a 1975 French softcore erotica film directed by Francis Giacobetti and starring Sylvia Kristel. The screenplay was written by Bob Elia and Francis Giacobetti. It is a sequel to the 1974 film Emmanuelle which was based on the novel Emmanuelle: The Joys of a Woman by Emmanuelle Arsan, and it loosely follows the plot of the novel's print sequel. The music score is by Francis Lai. Playing the small role of a masseuse is actress Laura Gemser, who would go on to play "Black Emanuelle" in her own series of erotic films.

Plot
Emmanuelle is travelling by ship to join her husband, Jean, in Hong Kong. To her annoyance there are no cabins available and she has to sleep in an all-female dorm. During the night, she is awakened by the girl in the neighboring bunk, who tells her that she is afraid of sleeping in a room full of women because she was raped by three Filipino girls while at boarding school in Macao—she concludes by confessing that she enjoyed it. Emmanuelle recognizes this as an invitation and the two women have sex.

Arriving in Hong Kong, Emmanuelle is reunited with Jean and, after a couple of attempts, manages to have passionate reunion sex. Emmanuelle slips into the life of the Hong Kong expat community. She becomes friends with Anna Maria, the young daughter of Peter, one of Jean's friends. The two swap sexual confidences and Anna Maria is forced to admit that she is still a virgin. Emmanuelle schemes to remedy this.

Over the course of the film, Emmanuelle has a series of sexual encounters. She has sex with Anna Maria's dance teacher while viewing an erotic cartoon on a peep show machine, and with a tattooed man in the locker room of the polo club. She experiences vivid sexual fantasies during an acupuncture session, and also masquerades as a prostitute in the Jade Garden, a notorious Hong Kong brothel, where she has sex with a group of sailors (told in flashback to Jean). Together with Jean and Anna Maria she visits a bathhouse, where they have steamy, full body contact massages by a trio of Thai woman.

Emmanuelle, Jean, and Anna Maria take a trip to Bali. When Jean emerges from the shower that night he finds Emmanuelle and Anna Maria waiting for him on the bed. Emmanuelle undresses Anna Maria and makes love to her, before sitting back and smiling approvingly while Jean takes the young woman's virginity.

Cast 
 Sylvia Kristel as Emmanuelle
 Umberto Orsini as Jean
 Catherine Rivet as Anna-Maria
 Frédéric Lagache as Christopher
 Caroline Laurence as Ingrid
 Henry Czarniak as Igor
 Tom Clark as Peter
 Venantino Venantini as The Polo Player
 Laura Gemser as Masseuse

References

External links 
 
 

1975 drama films
1970s pornographic films
1975 films
Emmanuelle
Films scored by Francis Lai
French erotic films
Films set in Hong Kong
Films set in Indonesia
1970s French-language films
1970s French films